River Rat is the eighth full-length studio album by American country rap artist Ryan Upchurch. It was released on December 21, 2018 via Redneck Nation Records. It was recorded in Nashville, Tennessee and produced by Thomas "Greenway" Toner a.k.a. T-Stoner.

The album peaked at number 191 on the Billboard 200 albums chart and at number 21 on the Top Country Albums chart in the United States

Track listing

Charts

References

External links
River Rat by Upchurch on iTunes
Upchurch© River Rat album on Redneck Nation

2018 albums
Upchurch (musician) albums